Alan Feinstein (born 8 September 1941, New York City, New York) is an American actor. Early in his career, he was credited as Alan Yorke.

He is noted for his 1983 award-winning stage performance in A View from the Bridge. From 1978-1979, he starred in the short lived QM Productions TV series The Runaways as Steve Arrizio, a former juvenile officer turned clinical psychologist who rescued runaway children from danger.

His film credits include roles in Bad Girls Go to Hell (1965, credited as Alan Yorke), Looking for Mr. Goodbar (1977), The Two Worlds of Jennie Logan (1979), Merchants of Venus (1998), and the television series Masada (1981) and The Paper Chase (1984).

Feinstein dated actress Lana Wood for most of the 1980s, and was in attendance at the funeral of her sister Natalie.

References

External links

1941 births
Male actors from New York City
Drama Desk Award winners
Living people
20th-century American male actors